Niccolò Ricchi (born 10 November 1998) is an Italian professional footballer who plays as a left back for  club Lucchese.

Club career
Born in Florence, Ricchi started his career in Empoli youth sector. He was promoted to the first team in the 2018–19 season, and was an unused substitute on 19 January 2020 against Cagliari for Serie A.

On 18 July 2019, he was loaned to Serie C club Ravenna.

In January 2020, he was loaned again to Serie C club Cavese. He signed with the club the next season.

On 6 July 2021, he signed with Viterbese.

On 8 February 2022, he joined Lucchese.

References

External links
 
 

1998 births
Living people
Footballers from Florence
Italian footballers
Association football midfielders
Serie C players
Empoli F.C. players
Ravenna F.C. players
Cavese 1919 players
U.S. Viterbese 1908 players
Lucchese 1905 players